Rahannagragh is a ringfort and National Monument located in County Galway, Ireland.

Location
Rahannagragh is located 4.2 km (2.6 miles) southeast of Loughrea.

History and description

Rahannagragh is surrounded by a ditch and a bank.

References

National Monuments in County Galway
Archaeological sites in County Galway